This is a timeline of achievements in Soviet and United States spaceflight, spanning the Cold War era of nationalistic competition known as the Space Race. 

This list is limited to first achievements by the USSR and USA which were important during the Space Race in terms of public perception and/or technical innovation. This excludes first uses of specific on-board equipment and new scientific discoveries, or achievements by other countries.

Beginning

1957–1959

1960–1969

1970–1979

1980–1989 

On 1991 December 31, the United Nations accepted the dissolution of the USSR, which meant the end of the space race.

See also

List of communications satellite firsts
List of space exploration milestones, 1957–1969
Timeline of space exploration
Timeline of first orbital launches by country
Timeline of space travel by nationality

Notes

References

External links 
Timeline of the Space Race/Moon Race
Chronology: Moon Race at russianspaceweb.com

Lists of firsts in space
Space policy
Technological races
Space Race
History of science and technology in the United States
Soviet Union–United States relations
Spaceflight timelines
Space Race